Patricia Demartini (born 14 August 1950) is a French speed skater. She competed in two events at the 1968 Winter Olympics.

References

1950 births
Living people
French female speed skaters
Olympic speed skaters of France
Speed skaters at the 1968 Winter Olympics
Sportspeople from Grenoble